Thorsten Pech (born 3 November 1960) is a German church musician.

Life 
Born in Wuppertal, Pech studied Protestant church music at the Robert Schumann Hochschule Düsseldorf from 1976 to 1980 with Hanns-Alfons Siegel (organ), Alberte Brun (piano), Hartmut Schmidt (choir direction). After his postgraduate studies in organ and participation in various master classes (among others Daniel Roth, Anton Heiller) he passed his final examination in 1983 with Hans-Dieter Möller. Pech completed his conducting studies in Vienna with Julius Kalmar in 1985 with a diploma.

In 1992, Pech also took up freelance work as a concert organist and conductor, which has led him through numerous concert engagements at home and abroad.

Recordings 

Source:

 Soli Deo Gloria: Bachverein Düsseldorf und Thorsten Pech (direction and organ)
 Orgelwanderung durch Elberfeld – Thorsten Pech spielt an den Orgeln der Friedhofskirche (Sauer), Kreuzkirche (Beckerath), Auferstehungskirche (Peter) and Kolk (Klais)
 Die Klais-Orgel der Alten luth. Kirche am Kolk, Wuppertal-Elberfeld: Thorsten Pech (organ)
 Die heitere Orgel – Thorsten Pech spielt an der Klais/Sauer-Orgel der Herz-Jesu-Kirche Wuppertal
 Josef Gabriel Rheinberger – Das Orgelwerk – Thorsten Pech spielt an der Klais/Sauer-Orgel der Herz-Jesu-Kirche Wuppertal
 Bach trifft … auf europäische Musiktraditionen: Uwe Komischke (trumpet) and Thorsten Pech (organ)
 Romantische Impressionen: Uwe Komischke (trumpet) and Thorsten Pech (organ)
 Musik und Meditation im Jahreskreis der Kirche: Uwe Komischke (trumpet) and Thorsten Pech (organ) in Kloster Huysburg
 Musik in der Kulturhauptstadt Weimar: Uwe Komischke (trumpet), Weimarer Bach-Trompeten-Ensemble and Thorsten Pech (organ)
 Trompete und Orgel in der Bergkirche Schleiz: Uwe Komischke (trumpet) and Thorsten Pech (organ)
 Meisterwerke Trompete und Orgel in der Christuskirche Schwelm: Uwe Komischke (Trompete) and Thorsten Pech (organ)
 The Cathedral: Uwe Komischke (trumpet), Weimarer Bach-Trompeten-Ensemble und Thorsten Pech (organ)
 Trompete und Orgel an der Klais-Orgel der Pfarrkirche Bonn-Endenich: Uwe Komischke (trumpet) und Thorsten Pech (organ)
 Festliche Bläsermusiken für die Dresdner Frauenkirche: Uwe Komischke (trumpet), Weimarer Bach-Trompeten-Ensemble and Thorsten Pech (organ)
 In dir ist Freude: Uwe Komischke (trumpet) und Thorsten Pech (organ) in der Christuskirche Schwelm

References

External links 

 
 
 
 Thorsten Pech and Uwe Komischke perform Faure's "Cantique de Jean Racine" arr. for trumpet and organ on Reddit

German classical organists
20th-century German composers
German choral conductors
1960 births
Living people
Musicians from Wuppertal